Mario De Negri (27 November 1901 – 28 January 1978) was an Italian sprinter who competed at the 1932 Summer Olympics.

Olympic results

See also
 Italy national relay team

References

External links
 

1901 births
1978 deaths
Italian male sprinters
Olympic athletes of Italy
Athletes (track and field) at the 1932 Summer Olympics